Mehdi Abrishamchi ( born in 1947 in Tehran) is a high-ranking member of the People's Mujahedin of Iran (MEK).

Early life 
Abrishamchi came from a well-known anti-Shah bazaari family in Tehran, and participated in June 5, 1963, demonstrations in Iran. He became a member of Hojjatieh, and left it to join the People's Mujahedin of Iran (MEK) in 1969. In 1972 he was imprisoned for being a MEK member, and spent time in jail until 1979.

Career
Shortly after Iranian Revolution, he became one of the senior members of the MEK. He is now an official in the National Council of Resistance of Iran.

Electoral history

Personal life
Abrishamchi was married to Maryam Rajavi from 1980 to 1985. Shortly after, he married Mousa Khiabani's younger sister Azar.

Legacy
Abrishamchi credited Massoud Rajavi for saving the People's Mojahedin Organization of Iran after the "great schism".

References 

1947 births
Living people
University of Tehran alumni
People's Mojahedin Organization of Iran members